Anadenosternum is a genus of mites in the family Parasitidae.

Species
 Anadenosternum azaleensis (Daele, 1975)     
 Anadenosternum pediculosum Karg & Glockemann, 1995

References

Parasitidae